Anabremia inquilina is a gall midge and a member of the genus Anabremia. This species was first described from Italy in 1965. It is an inquiline of another gall midge - Jaapiella medicaginis - which makes galls on Medicago species.

References

Cecidomyiidae
Galls
Insects described in 1965